The Whitewater Formation is a geologic formation in Ohio and Indiana. It preserves fossils dating back to the Ordovician period.

Type Section
The Whitewater was first named by J. M. Nickles in 1903.  He described exposures of limestone and interbedded calcareous shale along the Whitewater River at Richmond, Wayne County, Indiana.

Fossils of Richmond South outcrop
An excellent exposure of the Whitewater Formation is a roadcut located on Route 27 south of Richmond, Indiana, at 39.7877 N, -84.9014 W.

See also
 List of fossiliferous stratigraphic units in Ohio
 List of fossiliferous stratigraphic units in Indiana

References

 

Ordovician System of North America
Ordovician Kentucky
Ordovician Ohio
Ordovician Indiana
Ordovician southern paleotemperate deposits
Ordovician southern paleotropical deposits
Upper Ordovician Series